Roadhouse Sun is the second studio album by Ryan Bingham & The Dead Horses.

Track listing

Personnel
Anthony "Antoine" Arvizu - Percussion, Cymbals, Sound Effects, Tambourine, Producer, Engineer, Drums (Snare), Shaker, Mixing
Kevin Bartley - Mastering
Heather Bennett - Assistant Engineer
Ryan Bingham - Guitar (Acoustic), Guitar (Electric), Harp, Keyboards, Vocals, Vocals (background), Lead, Group Member
Kim Buie - A&R
John Dehais - Management
Elijah Ford - Guitar (12-String), Bass, Piano, Vocals (background)
Marc Ford - Guitar (Acoustic), Bass, Piano, Bass (Electric), Guitar (Electric), Tambourine, Vocals (background), Guitar (12 String), Producer, Slide Guitar, Shaker, Bass (Acoustic), Mixing, 12-String Bass Guitar, Papoose
Janice Hudgins - Accordion
Jeff Lightning - Lewis Assistant Engineer
Pat Magnarella - Management
Mike Malone - Piano, Vocals (background)
Larry Meyers - Violin, Viola
Karen Naff - Design
Corby Schaub - Guitar (Acoustic), Dobro, Mandolin, Guitar (Electric), Vocals (background), Slide Guitar, Lap Steel Guitar, Guitar (Resonator), Papoose
Matt Smith - Drums, Vocals, Vocals (background), Group Member

Chart performance

Music videos
 (Directed/ Produced by Anna Axster)

References

Ryan Bingham albums
2009 albums
Lost Highway Records albums